Kidon is a 2013 French-Israeli spy action comedy film about the Israeli Mossad's attempts to find out who killed Hamas senior military commander Mahmoud Al-Mabhouh in 2010. In real life, Kidon is a secretive Mossad special operations killing unit.

Kidon was written and directed by Emmanuel Naccache. The hotel scenes were filmed at a hotel in Eilat, Israel, standing in for the Dubai hotel where the actual killing took place.

When the family of Al-Mabhouh learned that in one of the scenes his character drinks alcohol and submits to Israeli "temptress" Bar Refaeli, the family said it would sue to stop the film’s distribution arguing that it hurt the Hamas commander's reputation.

Cast
Tomer Sisley as Daniel
Lionel Abelanski as Eric
Kev Adams as Facebook
Hippolyte Girardot as Monsieur Garnier
Élodie Hesme as Solène
Bar Refaeli as Einav
Sasson Gabai as Yair Yitzhaki (as Sasson Gabay)

Accolades
Kidon was nominated for the 2013 Ophir Awards of the Israeli Film Academy for Best Actress (Reymonde Amsallem) and Best Sound (Itai Elohev and Gil Toren). The film was also voted "Best Film Audience Choice Award" at the SERET 2014 film festival.

References

External links 
 

2013 films
2013 action comedy films
2013 multilingual films
Israeli multilingual films
Israeli action comedy films
French multilingual films
French action comedy films
2010s French films